This is a partial list of fictional countries in Europe.

A 

 Adjikistan: Featured Eurasian country in SOCOM: US Navy Seals.
 Alanbrooke: A fictionalized Ireland in Barbie in Rock 'N Royals.
 Al-Alemand: Islamic state consisting of the former Germany and the Low Countries. From the alternate history book The Years of Rice and Salt, by Kim Stanley Robinson.
 Al Amarja: Island nation located in Mediterranean, from the role playing game Over the Edge.
 Aldovia: A European kingdom in A Christmas Prince by Netflix.
 Alfaine: Appeared in Jules Lemaitre's Prince Hermann Regent (1893).
 Alpenstein: European principality and former ally of Nazi Germany featured in San Sombrèro: A Land of Carnivals, Cocktails and Coups.
 Alpine Emirates: Islamic states in the Bavarian Alps in the alternate history book The Years of Rice and Salt, by Kim Stanley Robinson.
 Alsander: Southern European state in James Elroy Flecker's King of Alsander (1914).
 Altis and Stratis: an insular Mediterranean country in ARMA 3 located between Italy and Greece, and modelled after the real-life Greek Aegean islands of Lemnos (Altis) and Agios Efstratios (Stratis).
 Alvonia: European kingdom from the film My Pal, the King (1932).
 Anatruria: Balkanic kingdom in the Bernie Rhodenbarr novel The Burglar Who Thought He Was Bogart.
 Andalasia: The cartoon kingdom in Enchanted where Giselle, Prince Edward, Queen Narissa, Nathaniel and Pip live.
 Apollonia: An Italian-based kingdom in Barbie as the Island Princess.
Arendelle: small Nordic kingdom based on real-life Norway in the 2013 film Frozen.
 Ariana: A country to the south of Atropia.
 Arstotzka: The communist state in the video game Papers, Please where the player character works as an immigration inspector at a border checkpoint
 Atlantic Europa (大西洋歐羅巴國): A European country mentioned in The Tale of Eliminating Bandits (蕩寇誌, 1847), one of the sequels of Water Margin.
 Atropia: A fictional pro-Western dictatorship used for US and NATO exercises; exercise maps depict the country's borders as loosely corresponding to those of Azerbaijan.
 Averna: A fictional oil-rich principality on the Adriatic Sea in the novel, Sweet Danger (1933) by Margery Allingham.
 Axphain: Neighbor of Graustark.

B 
 Bacteria: Thinly disguised version of Fascist Italy from the film The Great Dictator. Bears the same name as the microorganism.
 Balinderry: Strategically placed quasi-Irish nation that is crucial to a defence radar system, but has an IRA-type insurgency, in an episode of The Six Million Dollar Man.
 Balkistan: Appeared in Allen Upward's The Prince of Balkistan (1895).
 Baltish, A fictional country from a Lithuanian TV show of the same name.
 Bandrika (sometimes spelled Vandreka): Eastern European Alpine country, the setting of the first part of the film The Lady Vanishes. The language spoken in this country is an amalgamation of several European languages.
 Barataria, Fictional island nation, presumably in the Mediterranean, promised by Don Quixote to Sancho Panza in the novel The Ingenious Gentleman Don Quixote of La Mancha. Setting for part of Gilbert and Sullivan's The Gondoliers, it becomes a Republican Monarchy during the course of the operetta.
 Baronia: the country from which Prince Paul comes in The Secret Series by Enid Blyton
 Barscheit: a principality in The Princess Elopes (1905), a "Ruritanian" romance by Harold MacGrath.
 Bartovia: a European Country in The Simpsons; in the episode "The Italian Bob" Sideshow Bob was trying to decide on a new place to live, he took a globe, spun it, and stabbed it with a knife, so as to get a random country. After a couple of more unpleasant options, the knife stabs Bartovia, to which Bob says, "Now cut that out."
 Belgardia, an impoverished European Kingdom in King Kelly of the U.S.A.
 Belgravia: A fictional European country in The Princess Switch on Netflix. Belgravia is also the name of a district in Central London.
 Belsornia: A country created by Elinor Brent-Dyer and home to a number of characters who appear in the Chalet School series
 Bessonia: A "small Latin state" bordering Switzerland in Tiny Carteret (1930) by Sapper.
 Blitva: A state in northeastern Europe, ruled by a dictator; in the novel Banket u Blitvi (Banquet in Blitva, 1939) by Croatian novelist Miroslav Krleža. Blitva is the Croatian word for chard.
 Borduria:  A totalitarian state from the comics series The Adventures of Tintin, located in the Balkans. Its first appearance is in King Ottokar's Sceptre (1938).
 Borginia: Northern-European country featured in the Apollo Justice: Ace Attorney and Ace Attorney Investigations: Miles Edgeworth video games.
 Borostyria: A kingdom in the 1933 Arsène Lupin novel The Woman with Two Smiles.
 Borovia: Central-European country from The Big Knights TV programme (1999).
 Borobia is also a communist Eastern European country in the G.I. Joe comics by Marvel Comics, starting from issue #61 (1987).
 Borsovia: A kingdom in Eastern Europe that featured in Gordon Murray's BBC Television children's puppet series A Rubovian Legend, 1955–63.
 Bosnaria: A fictional country between Bulgaria and the Ottoman empire in the 19th century in the Flemish comic series Robert en Bertrand, episode 45 Drama in de Orient-Express.
 Braslavia: A fictional country, a dictatorship, bordering Austria in La Patrouille des Castors episodes 13 La Courone Cachée and 14 Le Chaudron du Diable.
 Bratislavia: A fictional country mentioned in Count Duckula.
 Bratislava, portrayed as a country in The Slipper and the Rose.
 Bretzelburg: central European dictatorship from Spirou et Fantasio comics.
 Brogavia: A Nazi-occupied Balkan nation featured in Commando Comics.
 Brungaria: An eastern European country politically opposed to the United States and a principal source of antagonists in the Tom Swift Jr. book series.
Buronia: A European monarchy in the North Sea next to the United Kingdom featured in Prince of Peoria

C 
Creponia: mentioned in That’s So Raven
 Cagliostro: a small European kingdom in the animated film The Castle of Cagliostro.
 Caledonia: a European sovereign kingdom country in Scandal episode Heavy is the Head, whose current monarch is the Queen Isabel of Caledonia and later, her son, Prince Richard of Caledonia. It is based in the United Kingdom.
 Carovia: small European kingdom from the film Trouble for Two.
 Carpania: European kingdom in the film The Great Race.
 Carpathia: Kingdom in central Europe from the play The Sleeping Prince by Terence Rattigan and the subsequent film The Prince and the Showgirl and musical The Girl Who Came to Supper
 Chernarus: meaning "Black Rus", a post-Soviet state located in Eastern Europe and setting for ARMA 2 and DayZ. The terrain used on those games is set in the fictional "South Zagoria" province, an accurate recreation from geographical data of real landscape between the cities of Ústí nad Labem and Děčín in the Czech Republic.
 Chocovakia: European republic setting for the #0-issue of the Flemish Spike and Suzy-series, borders Belgium, named based on Czechoslovakia.
 Codophia: a European country featured in Ace Attorney Investigations: Miles Edgeworth. It was divided into Allebahst and Babahl during the events of the game.
 Concordia: a small country only a few miles across somewhere in Europe in the play Romanoff and Juliet and its film adaptation.
 Cordinia: a small sovereign state in the south of France that appears in A Royal Christmas.
 Cordina: locale in Nora Roberts' romance novels, especially the Cordina's Royal Family series.
 Cordovia: Fictional war torn country in the present day Russian province of Dagestan. Mentioned in Season 2 of BoJack Horseman. 
 Cordonia: Fictional country of the Prince who stays at Grey House as mentioned in ’The Good Witch’ TV Show. It is also mentioned in the Pixelberry Studios game Choices. 
Corona, the kingdom in which the Disney film Tangled is set. It has Germanic and Polish influences.
Coronia, Balkan kingdom from Get Smart.  Inspired by Ruritania.
Costa Lottsa: Tiny nation located between Italy and France, mentioned in San Sombrèro: A Land of Carnivals, Cocktails and Coups
Crenotaninia, a small place where Bjorn is from in the episode of Fish Hooks.
Crystallia, a rich island country between Greece and Turkey

D 

Dalmatia: a tiny Balkan nation whose royal family were exiled to Great Britain after a communist revolution there. Dalmatia did really exist, although it had not had its own king since the Middle Ages. The royal family is fictitious, as is the hymn. Seen in the TV series You Rang, M'Lord?.
 Darklonia: Country ruled by Destro's cousin, Darklon, in G.I. Joe: A Real American Hero.
 Dawsbergen: neighbor of Graustark.
 Donovia: A country to the north of Atropia.
 Doppelkinn: neighboring principality to Barscheit (Harold MacGrath, The Princess Elopes, 1905).
 Dor: The kingdom that The Tale of Despereaux takes place in.
 Drackenberg: a European country from Lloyd Alexander's The Drackenberg Adventure.
 Drasuvania (ドラスベニア Dorasubenia) is a fictional Eastern Europe country in the world of 11eyes. It is the home country of Verard and Yukiko Hirohara. It lies at the border between Europe and Asia.
 Dreisenburg: A tiny Germanic nation featured in the pilot of The Secret Service.
 Drusselstein: a fictional Germanic country in Phineas and Ferb. It is the home country of Doofenshmirtz.
 Ducklovia: a country bordering Serbia in Count Duckula
 Dulcinea: a kingdom in Barbie as the Princess and the Pauper, where King Dominick is from.
 Dunwyn: a kingdom in the TV series Adventures of the Gummi Bears.
 Druznia: a country based on Russia that is against the Americans seen in the TV series Regular Show.

E 

 East European Republic: an anti-American power from the Mission: Impossible TV episode "Submarine". Possibly the same as the East European People's Republic (EEPR) from "The Party" and the European People's Republic from "Invasion".
 Edwal: Wales, in Leslie Reid's Cauldron Bubble (1934).
 Ehrenstein, of which the capital is Dreiberg: principality of Princess Hildegarde in Harold MacGrath, The Goose Girl (1909, #8 US best seller).
 Eisneria: a republic in the Balkans from the Road Rovers TV series.
 Elbonia: a fourth-world post-communist Eastern European country in the comic strip Dilbert.
 Eldia: a Germanic island nation from the manga/anime series Attack on Titan. 
 Enchancia: The main kingdom in Sofia the First.
 England, England: The Isle of Wight becomes its own country and an England-themed Theme Park in the novel England, England.
 Essenheim: appeared in John Rowe Townsend's A Foreign Affair (1982).
 Estrovia: European kingdom in the film A King in New York.
 Esturia: dictatorship in Eastern Europe in La Patrouille des Castors episode 5 La Bouteille à la Mer. 
 Euphrania: tiny kingdom in the film The Slipper and the Rose.
 Eurasia: the fictional superstate in George Orwell's Nineteen Eighty-Four formed from Europe and the former Soviet Union.
 Euroslavia: Eastern European country that comprises most of Europe; home to a supervillain in the cartoon The Ripping Friends.
 Evallonia: Central European country in the novels of John Buchan.
 Evarchia: Eastern European country from Brigid Brophy's Palace Without Chairs.

F 

 Fairytopia: A kingdom in Barbie: Fairytopia and its sequels and spinoffs, neighbored by Flutterfield (based on Spain) and Shimmervale (based on Portugal).
 Fasilica: appeared in an early 1914 serial by Rex Stout, of later Nero Wolfe fame, reprinted in the 1990s as A Prize for Princes.
 Flavonia: appeared in Violet Needham's Betrayer (1950) and other novels by the author.
 Florin: one of the fictional principalities in William Goldman's novel The Princess Bride.
 Floravia: A European kingdom in Barbie: Princess Adventure.
 Fosboria: a fictional Eastern European country in the 19th century in the Flemish comic series Robert en Bertrand, episode 28 The Duel.
 Franistan: from the I Love Lucy episode 'The Publicity Agent' in which Lucy pretends to be the "Maharincess of Franistan", royalty from a faraway land who is a big fan of Ricky's, in order to get Ricky some publicity.
 Freedonia: From the Marx Brothers' film Duck Soup. It is ruled by Rufus T. Firefly (Groucho Marx).
 Franchia: a strange country in Welcome to Night Vale, described as "a land of arches'. It is a country with no residents at all, with the possible exception of a great beast, just hundreds of square miles of ancient stone arches, intertwined and leaning against each other, with the wind hollowing through the narrow alleyways.
 Frobnia: Communist Eastern Bloc nation in Central Europe from Infocom's interactive fiction game Border Zone, bordering neutral Litzenburg.
 Frovania: Eastern European country in the 19th century in the Flemish comic series Robert en Bertrand, episodes 49 De Gouden Hand and 50 De wraak van Zabor.

G 

 Gallowmere: A fictional kingdom in the MediEvil video game series.
 Gantha: Southern European state in James Elroy Flecker's King of Alsander (1914).
 Genovia: From The Princess Diaries novel series and film adaptations (The Princess Diaries and The Princess Diaries 2: Royal Engagement). In the novels, it is a principality between Italy and France; in the film it is between Spain and France. Either way, it is based on Monaco, and to a lesser extent on Andorra.
 Gerolstein a fictional Grand Duchy in Jacques Offenbach's comic opera La Grande-Duchesse de Gérolstein.  The realm also appears in Robert Louis Stevenson's Prince Otto and Eugène Sue's The Mysteries of Paris
 Glenraven: a tiny country in the Alps, no bigger than Liechtenstein, squeezed into the border between France and Italy in Glenraven series by Marion Zimmer Bradley.
 Glottenberg: kingdom in Sport Royal and The Heart of Princess Osra by Anthony Hope
 Gonobutz: Bob de Moor's Barelli comics.
 Gorgas: A country to the northwest of Atropia.
 Granbretan: a future evil version of Great Britain where the noble classes hide behind metal masks of various totem animals, created by Michael Moorcock in his The History of the Runestaff books.
 Grand Fenwick: a Duchy in The Mouse That Roared and sequels by Leonard Wibberley.
 Graustark: Eastern European country in several novels by George Barr McCutcheon.
 Greenvale: the kingdom in the video game Overlord: Dark Legend is set.
 Graznavia: an Eastern European republic ravaged by civil war in This War of Mine, a video game by 11 bit studios.
 Grenyarnia: a secret European country only rich people know about, alluded to by Jerry Seinfeld as a highly exclusive vacationing destination in the 30 Rock episode SeinfeldVision.
 Grendel: England in Leslie Reid's Cauldron Bubble (1934).
 Grimzimistan: The rival country of Réndøosîa (see below) in The Amazing Adrenalini Brothers.
 Groland: A parody of France as well as European microstates, shown on Canal Plus television.
 Grulovia: a fictional Eastern European country from the Psychonauts game series.
 Grünewald: an imaginary Germanic state where the novel Prince Otto (1885) by Robert Louis Stevenson is set.
 Guilder: one of the fictional principalities in William Goldman's The Princess Bride.
 Gyenorvya: A fictional small European country hosting EuropeVision, (a parody of EuroVision) in the Netflix Series Q-Force.

H 

 Hav: a European city-state in Jan Morris's novel Last Letters from Hav. Crimea-like in location.
 Hedestad: a Swedish island in Stieg Larsson's novel Män som hatar kvinnor (2005).
 Herzoslovakia: a small Balkan state in Agatha Christie's novel The Secret of Chimneys (1925) and in "The Stymphalean Birds" from the novel The Labours of Hercules (1947).
 Hohenphalia: home principality of Princess Hildegarde in Harold MacGrath's Arms and the Woman (1899).
 Hohenwald: home principality of the heroine in Richard Harding Davis, The Princess Aline (1895).
 Holstenwall:  a shadowy village of twisted buildings and spiraling streets in The Cabinet of Dr. Caligari (1920).
 Principality of Hazelrink: homeland of the princess Charlotte Hazelrink in the Anime Princess Lover!

I 

 Illyria: Eastern European country featured in the play Twelfth Night by William Shakespeare & subsequently in Les Mains Sales (Dirty Hands) by Jean-Paul Sartre. Illyria is also an ancient Greek & Roman name for a part of the Balkans. Illyria is again used as a fictional kingdom in the film, Secret Society of Second-Born Royals
 Irania: small European kingdom from the film Trouble for Two.
 Ithuvania: Eastern European country used as an experiment, featured in The Far Side cartoon books.
 Ixania: a small Balkan country of little global importance in Eric Ambler's The Dark Frontier.

J 

 Jugendheit: kingdom of King Frederick in Harold MacGrath's The Goose Girl (1909, #8 US best seller) Note that the name is a kind of pig-German literally meaning "youthness".

K 
 Kalos: a region based on France in Pokémon X and Y.
 Karathia: Slavic monarchy in the Three Investigators series.
 Karetsefia: Eastern European country in Elizabeth Kay's Beware of Men with Moustaches.
 Karistan: Central European country in the Polish-American film Legend of the White Horse.
 Karlova: European kingdom in Edgar Rice Burroughs's The Rider (1918).
 Karlsberg: principality of the hero of Sigmund Romberg's "The Student Prince" (1924 Broadway musical; 1954 film with Mario Lanza).
 Kasnia: war-torn Eastern European monarchy in the DC Animated Universe.
 Krassnia: Former republic of the Soviet Union in the Caucasus that declared independence with the dissolution of the Soviet Union based on South Ossetia, from the 2010 novel The Restoration Game by Ken MacLeod.
 Kastovia: a fictional country in the Caucasus, from the 2019 video game Call of Duty: Modern Warfare.
 Katzenstok: a republic in the Balkans from Road Rovers TV series.
 Keltic Sultanate: Islamic sultanate comprising the British Isles. From the alternate history book The Years of Rice and Salt, by Kim Stanley Robinson.
 Kemalia: A country used in US and NATO exercises that has its borders loosely correspond to those of Turkey.
 Klayd: A country in Europe where some events of My Hero Academia: World Heroes' Mission take place. 
 Klopstokia: Central European country from Million Dollar Legs film by Edward F. Cline.
 Klugenstein: Germanic dukedom from A Medieval Romance (1870 short story) by Mark Twain.
 Kochenia: A European country in the Korean drama Blood.
 Krakozhia: from the film The Terminal.
 Krasnia: Ivor Novello's Glamorous Night, Stage play, 1935.
 Krastava: small Eastern European country located between Poland and Czechoslovakia from the novel The Mourner by Richard Stark.
 Kravonia: Eastern European country from the novel Sophy of Kravonia by Anthony Hope and the subsequent film.
 Krayia: realm of Queen Nadya in Noël Coward's, The Queen Was in the Parlour (play, 1922).

L 
 Laevatia: Balkan state in Nevil Shute's 1938 novel Ruined City.
 Lampidorra: principality in the film Penny Princess.
 Lanconia: Eastern European country referenced in Jude Deveraux's romance novels.
 Lapathia: appeared in the Three Investigators series (created by Robert Arthur, Jr.) in the book The Mystery of the Flaming Footprints (1971).
 Latkovia: an Eastern nation featured in the Amalgam Comics crossover between Marvel Comics and DC Comics.
 Latveria: a kingdom in the Fantastic Four comic-book series ruled by tyrannical Doctor Doom.
 Latvislavia: fictional European country in Donald Duck. Known of its national football team.
 Laurania: the republic in Savrola (A Tale of the Revolution in Laurania) by Winston Churchill.
 Laurentia: kingdom in the stage musical King's Rhapsody and subsequent film.
 Letzenstein: a tiny state, presumably based on Liechtenstein, which is featured in Meriol Trevor's "Letzenstein Chronicles" series of books.
 Leutonia: Eastern European home of the Happy Wanderers (Yosh & Stan Shmenge) from SCTV.
 Lichtenburg: made famous by Ethel Merman in the musical comedy Call Me Madam.
 Lichtenburg: a Balkan grand duchy in the film The Son of Monte Cristo.
 Lichenstamp: a country in one episode of the comedy series The Suite Life on Deck.
 Liechtenhaus: a small European principality featured in the Italian film Piccolo grande amore by Carlo Vanzina (1993).
 Limaria: a country used in US and NATO exercises that lies on Atropia's western border and has its borders loosely correspond to those of Armenia.
 Limberwisk: an April Fools joke by Geography Now.
 Lissenberg: appeared in Jane Aiken Hodge's Leading Lady (1990).
 Listenbourg: a fictional country at the edge of the Iberian Peninsula which originated as an internet meme spread on Twitter.
 Litzenburg: politically neutral country in Central Europe from Infocom's interactive fiction game Border Zone, bordering communist Frobnia.
 Livonia: from the video game ARMA 3: Contact and DayZ: Livonia, it is a Polish-speaking Baltic country that is a member of NATO and borders four other countries, including Russia through Kaliningrad, and Belarus.
Losania is a small country in Eastern Europe by World's End Harem.
 Lubenia is a fictional state created for the joint Russo-Belarusian Zapad 2017 exercise. Supports Veyshnoria in its struggle for independence. The territory of Lubenia corresponds to that of Podlaskie and Warmian-Masurian voivodeships of Poland. It also includes parts of Alytus and Marijampolė counties of Lithuania. Roughly corresponds to the Suwałki Gap – a point of great strategic and military importance for NATO.
 Lucrania: pro-Nazi country bordering Germany, France and Switzerland in Biggles – Secret Agent by W. E. Johns.
 Luftnarp: a country located in the Alps in Welcome to Night Vale.
 Lutha: a small Balkan kingdom from the novel The Mad King by Edgar Rice Burroughs.

M 
 Madelvia: a small European kingdom that appears in the Freeform film My Christmas Prince.
 Maestrazgo (Aragonese: Mayestrato) is a comarca in southeastern Aragon, Spain. Its names derives from the Maestrat/Maestrazgo mountain massif that extends to the east to the Comarques of the Valencian Community Alt Maestrat and Baix Maestrat. Also, a European fictional kingdom in the blog Blog de heraldica
 Magyaristan: Islamic state in the former Hungary. From the alternate history book The Years of Rice and Salt by Kim Stanley Robinson.
 Malaria: a kingdom in the animated film Igor.
 Maldavia: principality in Eastern Europe that is mentioned by Muffy in the Arthur season 10 episode "Family Fortune".
 Mandorra: European kingdom in the U.S. motion picture, The Brigand.
 Mandrika: Mountainous European country on Alfred Hitchcock's film The Lady Vanishes (1938).
 Margoth: European kingdom in Edgar Rice Burroughs's The Rider.
 Marisi: appears in Rex Stout's A Prize for Princes ("Ruritanian romance" set in Fasilica and Marisi; serialized in 1914 and reprinted as a book in the 1990s; author is the later creator of the Nero Wolfe mystery series).
 Markovia: European monarchy in the DC Universe.
 Marshovia (Marsovia, Makovnia): small Eastern European kingdom most likely located somewhere near Transylvania in the operetta The Merry Widow.
 Medici: a Mediterranean country and setting of Just Cause 3
 Medioka: Ruritania type of mid-European country presented in the Mickey Mouse comic strip story "The Monarch of Medioka" (1937–38).
 Mendorra: principality located near Germany from the American soap opera, One Life to Live.
 Mervo: island principality in The Prince and Betty by P. G. Wodehouse
 Messina: principality in Richard Harding Davis's, The King's Jackal (1891).
 Minaria: Alternative name for Limaria.
 Mittenheim: grand duchy in The Heart of Princess Osra by Anthony Hope
 Mixo-Lydia: Balkan country in the novels of Angela Thirkell; has a long-standing enmity with neighbouring Slavo-Lydia.
 Moldavia: Eastern European country from the first episode of Batman and later Dynasty (note: Moldavia really exists as a nation itself and also as a region in Romania). It is also mentioned as a Balkan country and later as a Eastern European country in the 19th century in the Flemish comic series Robert en Bertrand with capital city Narkov and city Blitzy. In at least ten episodes.
 Moldovakia: Eastern European country in Recess best known for its spies and its luge team.
 Molvanîa: Eastern European country from a parody travel guidebook; from the same authors as Phaic Tăn and San Sombrèro.
 Monaco : Western European country and the main setting of the second season of Yakitate!! Japan anime. Unlike the real life Monaco, the Monaco from the anime series is not a principality and is ruled by a King.
 Monte Lucio: state ruled by a count in Violet Needham’s novel,  The Changeling of Monte Lucio  and also mentioned in some of her other works.
 Montenaro: European country featured in The Princess Switch: Switched Again. 
 Montland: an English-speaking constitutional monarchy in the Dead or Alive video game series. It is a home country of Amy and Luna.
 Moronica (alternatively, Moronika): parody of Nazi Germany from the Three Stooges short You Nazty Spy and its sequel I'll Never Heil Again, with "Moe Hailstone" as its dictator. A nation called Moronica also appeared in 2010's Bikini Jones and the Temple of Eros.
 Morvania: An Eastern European country in Jem, ruled by Queen (formerly Princess) Adriana Slododac. 
 Morvania (2): the Eastern European setting of Andre Norton's first published novel, Ruritanian romance The Prince Commands (1934). Though tiny, it seems to have been important due to strategic location; on his way there, the title character had to attend state occasions in London, Paris, and Berlin.
 Muravia: Republic in the Balkans with capital Stefania in Dashiell Hammett's story This King Business, featuring The Continental Op.
 Mypos: Native home of Balki Bartokomous on Perfect Strangers.

N 
 Nafrece: a country in Birdie Wing: Golf Girls' Story.
 Narcissia: A fictional version of Scotland ruled by Princess Portia in Barbie: Princess Charm School.
 Neustria: A French-speaking 14th-century western European kingdom in Leslie Barringer's Neustria cycle of historical fantasy. An actual Neustria existed from about the 6th to the 10th century, when it was absorbed into France. 
 Neutralia: Fictional version of Portugal from Arrival and Departure by Arthur Koestler.
 Neutralia: Mediterranean republic in Scott-King's Modern Europe by Evelyn Waugh
New German Republic: A technologically advanced post-apocalyptic society encompassing Central Europe that is governed by the Triax megacorporation in the Rifts role-playing game.
Nexdoria: a country from Coming 2 America, the neighbors of Zamunda
 Nihilon: a country somewhere in central Europe, run by nihilists, in Alan Sillitoe's comic novel Travels in Nihilon.
 Niroli: focus of a series of Harlequin Presents novels.
 Nordland: Ivor Novello's King's Rhapsody, 1949, stage play; probably not in Scandinavia because the characters have rather Balkan-sounding names. (Note: Nordland is a county of Norway).
 Norvenia: a fictional English-speaking country in The Boxtrolls.
 Novistrana: from the computer game Republic: The Revolution.
 Novoselic: The European country governed by Sonia Nevermind and her royal family in the PSP game Super Dangan Ronpa 2, the sequel to Dangan Ronpa, developed by Spike.

O 

 Oceania: fictional superstate in George Orwell's Nineteen Eighty-Four referring to Great Britain, the Americas, Australasia and southern Africa.
 Ornowitza: a Dutchy that appeared in Violet Needham's Betrayer (1950) and other novels by the author.
 Orsinia: featured in Ursula K. Le Guin's Orsinian Tales and Malafrena.
 Osia, of which the capital was Bleiberg: setting of Harold MacGrath's, The Puppet Crown (1901, in which year the book was the #7 US fiction best seller; a film version was released in 1915).
 Osterlich: nation invaded by Bacteria and Tomainia in the film The Great Dictator; obviously supposed to be Austria.
 Ostania: a country for the set of Spy × Family, based on the German Democratic Republic during the Cold War era. 
 Otheon  is a fictional country in Europe and a primary location for events in My Hero Academia: World Heroes' Mission.
 Ovitznia: a republic in the Balkans from Road Rovers TV series.

P 

Paldea: European region based on the Iberian peninsula in the video games Pokémon Scarlet and Violet.
 Pannonia: appeared in Guy Boothby's Long Live the King (1900).
 Panquita: European monarchy mentioned in second season of Yakitate!! Japan anime. A member of that nation's royal family, Princess Anne, was a guest judge at the baking exhibition.
Papilloma: Small European Kingdom, later Republic, from film Kath & Kimderella. Papilloma is a tiny and poor Spanish outpost on the heel of Italy. Last ruler was King Javier.
 Peaceland: European country featured in the anime Nadesico, which was once a theme park, but formed its own nation. It is neutral in all conflicts, on earth and beyond, has no taxes, and has a great banking system similar to that of Switzerland. Ruri "Ruri Ruri" Hoshino, a famous character of the series, is originally a princess from there.
 Penglia: European country, bordering Aldovia featured in the film A Christmas Prince. Both countries are engaged in a peace treaty originally signed on Christmas Eve 1419 that has to be renewed every 100 years.
 Penguin Island (L'île des Pingouins): in the 1908 novel by Anatole France, an island in the North Sea where penguins were miraculously transformed into humans (and which is in fact a satirical view on France).
 People's Republic of Great Britain: An Fictional version of Great Britain featured in the Doctor Who episode "Rise of the Cybermen".
 Pepeslavia: from the film Su Excelencia starring Mario Moreno (better known as Cantinflas). Probably referring to Yugoslavia.
 Perusalem is a satire of Germany (Preussen, i.e. Prussia) in The Inca of Perusalem by George Bernard Shaw.
 Petrovakia: a fictional union republic in the game Heavy Weapon, usually referring to Czechoslovakia.
 Pfennig Halbpfennig: presumably German/Eastern European Grand Duchy and setting for the operetta The Grand Duke, by Gilbert and Sullivan. Notable for an unusual law regarding "Statutory Duels", in which duelists compete by drawing playing cards – the loser then dies and becomes a "legal ghost".
 Poictesme: a country situated roughly in the south of France in the books of James Branch Cabell.
 Poland: Eastern European country similar to the real Poland in the play King Ubu by Alfred Jarry.
 Poldavia: a small country presumably in Eastern Europe in The Blue Lotus from The Adventures of Tintin.
 Pontevedro: a poverty-stricken Grand Duchy situated deep in the Balkans from the comedy play L'Attache d'ambassade by Henri Meilhac and the subsequent operetta and film The Merry Widow. Pontevedro is a veiled reference to the Balkan country of Montenegro.
 Pottibakia: Balkan country from the short story "What Does it Matter? A Morality" by E. M. Forster. Capital city: Ekarest.
 Pottsylvania: from Jay Ward's cartoon series The Rocky and Bullwinkle Show.
 Povia: a small monarchy in the Balkans in the Mission: Impossible TV episode "The Heir Apparent".
 Prydain: Welsh kingdom, ruled by the High King, in The Chronicles of Prydain novels by Lloyd Alexander.
 (Kalbsbraten-)Pumpernickel: German duchy, a caricature of Saxe-Weimar-Eisenach in Vanity Fair, The Fitz-Boodle Papers, and other works by William Makepeace Thackeray

Q 

 Qwghlm: a country off the northwestern coast of Britain in Neal Stephenson's fictions Cryptonomicon and The Baroque Cycle.

R 

 Razkavia: Germanic country in Philip Pullman's The Tin Princess.
 Réndøosîa: a fictional Eastern European country plagued by natural disasters to the point that its flag is always depicted with a hole in it. It is also at war with the neighboring nation of Grimzimistan. Homeland of Enk, Adi and Xan, the main characters on the animated series The Amazing Adrenalini Brothers.
 Republic of Great Britain: A fictional version of Great Britain featured in the Doctor Who story Inferno.
 Republic of Krovtonova: A fictional Eastern European nation referenced in the Father Ted episode "Speed 3", in which it is mentioned that Craggy Island has been helping to ease the republic's unusually high milk surplus.
 Robo-Hungarian Empire: A fictional Eastern European nation in several Futurama episodes.
 Rogash: A small Central European country featured in the Night Court episode "My Life as a Dog Lawyer". Despite its small size it possesses nuclear weapons and missiles supplied by the US government in exchange for maintaining a listening post to spy on Switzerland.
 Romanovia: Eastern European country featured in the comedy Dodgeball: A True Underdog Story. Dodgeball is the national sport. This country was also mentioned in Inspector Gadget.
 Rongovia: Fictional country mentioned in Santaland Diaries by David Sedaris. It has an embassy to the US in Trumansburg, New York, and a very active Ministry of Fine Arts. The capital is Fat City. Rongovia is a state of mind.
 Rovinia: a kingdom mentioned in Pursuit to Algiers.
 Rubovia: a kingdom in Eastern Europe that featured in Gordon Murray's BBC Television children's puppet series A Rubovian Legend, 1955–63.
 Rumekistan: a fictional Eastern European nation featured in Marvel Comics' Cable & Deadpool
 Ruritania: a kingdom in central Europe from Anthony Hope's The Prisoner of Zenda and associated works, which gave rise to the Ruritanian romance genre. Also used in Ernest Gellner's nonfictional Nations and Nationalism as a stereotypical country developing nationalism.

S 

 San Lorenzo: An insular European dictatorship with no extradition treaties, in the series Leverage, specifically the episodes The Big Bang Job and The San Lorenzo Job.
 Samavia: Eastern European kingdom in Frances Hodgson Burnett's The Lost Prince.
 Sardovia: An Eastern European Dictatorship bordering Belarus from the CBS program Scorpion 
 Saroczia: Eastern European country which the United States invades, which serves as the terrorist basis in the video game Winback.
 Sauville: small kingdom between France, Switzerland and Italy from anime series Gosick. It consists of parts of the real Italian provinces: Aosta Valley, Liguria, Piedmont.
 Sciriel: kingdom in Roland Pertwee's late (1927) Ruritanian romance A Modern Knight Errant, set just before and after World War I.
 Seravno: a Balkan country from the TV Series Mission Impossible.
 Servia: appeared in Bessie Marchant's A Princess of Servia (c. 1925). Also an ancient foreign name for Serbia.
 Sercia: Western European Fiction country, in Fandom

 Shimmervale: A Maltese based kingdom powered by Crystallites in Barbie: Mariposa & the Fairy Princess.
 Skandistan: Islamic state comprising what was formerly Scandinavia. From the alternate history book The Years of Rice and Salt by Kim Stanley Robinson.
 The People's Republic of Slaka: a Balkan communist country in Malcolm Bradbury's Rates of Exchange and its sequel Why Come to Slaka? It also featured in the BBC drama, the Gravy Train moves East. 
 Slavo-Lydia: Balkan country in the novels of Angela Thirkell; has a long-standing enmity with neighbouring Mixo-Lydia.
 Slavosk: a country in Eastern Europe from the TV series Danger Man. Drake must travel to Slavosk to rescue the supposed sister of a famous professor from this country.
 Slorenia: a small East European country in Marvel Comics. Its inhabitants were massacred by Ultron'.
 Slovetzia: a tiny country in Eastern Europe in the film The Beautician and the Beast. Slovetzia is located between Romania, Ukraine and Hungary; situated roughly in Trans-Carpathia, a real region in the Ukraine. The republic is portrayed as a post-communist Eastern European dictatorship.
 Sokovia: an Eastern European country home of H.Y.D.R.A. and birthplace of Scarlet Witch and Quicksilver from Avengers: Age of Ultron
 Island of Sodor: a large island in the Irish Sea, between the Isle of Man and the English mainland near Barrow-in-Furness in Cumbria, to which it is connected by bridge. The setting for the Reverend W. Awdry's The Railway Series and it's television adaptation. 
 Soviet Unterzoegersdorf: the "last existing appanage republic of the USSR", a fake country created by monochrom for theatre performances and computer games.
 St Gregory: a British Crown dependency in the Channel Islands, featured in the ITV series Island at War. Based upon Jersey and Guernsey.
 St Tulipe: a tiny European principality (ministate) in the 1981 Italian film Madly in Love. Its location is supposed to be between Germany and France.
 Strackenz: a tiny European duchy in the novel Royal Flash by George MacDonald Fraser that borders Denmark and Germany. It is threatened with invasion by both countries as a result of the Schleswig-Holstein Question.
 Svardia: a tiny European republic located in the Balkans from the Mission: Impossible episode "The Train".
 Svenborgia: a secret European country only rich people know about, referenced by Jack Donaghy and Jerry Seinfeld as an exclusive vacationing retreat in the SeinfeldVision episode of 30 Rock.
 Svitz: a mysterious European country in Welcome to Night Vale described as, "A land of low rolling hills and off-key tones heard on the breeze" and "is perfect for the visitor with a strong constitution, and a low tendency for hallucination."
 Syldavia: Balkan monarchy featured in four stories of The Adventures of Tintin, neighbouring Borduria.
 Sylvania: a country ruled by Queen Louise in the film The Love Parade. The name is also used in the Marx Brothers' film Duck Soup. It was the country which attacked Freedonia.
 Symkaria: a small Eastern European country from Marvel Comics, the homeland of renowned mercenary Silver Sable.

T 

 Taronia:  Ruritanian Kingdom from the film Thirty Day Princess (1934)
 Tauri-Hessia: European country in the book The Circus of Adventure, part of the Adventure Series by Enid Blyton.
Tcherkistan: East European country from the film Supercondriaque (2014)
 Tescara: European island nation located in the Atlantic Ocean. As a free trade zone enrolled into the United Nations in 1991, it is used as place of origin for the suspects of CSI: New York's season 1 episode 19, "Crime and Misdemeanor".
 Ticktockia: A small country between France and Germany, ruled by King Salazar the Pushy, that invades neighboring Warnerstock in the film Wakko's Wish.
 Thembria: A frigid land whose pillars are military dictatorship, unbridled incompetence, and constant threat of death from a firing squad. From Disney's cartoon series Tail Spin. Home of Colonel Spigot, Sergeant Dunder, professor Crackpotkin, and others.
 The Triple Monarchy of Scythia-Pannonia-Transbalkania: from Dr. Engelbert Eszterhazy stories by Avram Davidson.
 Tomainia: Nazi Germany-like country from the film The Great Dictator, ruled by Adenoid Hynkel.
 Transbalkania: a fictional kingdom featured in "Number 187", a story by Baroness Orczy.
 Trans-Carpathia: A country in Eastern Europe, used in G.I. Joe: A Real American Hero. Trans-Carpathia is also a real region in the Ukraine.
 Transia: a small East European nation in Marvel Comics. The location of Mount Wundagore, and the birthplace of Quicksilver and the Scarlet Witch.
 Tratvia: A country in Europe that formed the setting for the radio series The Embassy Lark, which dealt with the trials and tribulations of the British Ambassador to Tratvia and the foreign relations between Tratvia and the United Kingdom. It would later feature in several episodes of the related radio series The Navy Lark.
 Trent, Grand-Duchy of: European Grand-Duchy from the Mission: Impossible TV episode "The Choice".
 Tryphemia: King Pausole's country in The Adventures of King Pausole by Pierre Louÿs
 Turgisia: A small former Soviet republic located on the Azov Sea between Russia and Ukraine from the Danish political drama series Borgen

U 

 Ulgia: a politically unstable country from the anime Noir.
 Ulmreich: Southern European state in James Elroy Flecker's King of Alsander (1914).
 Urk (also Uruk): The war-torn Mediterranean country the characters on Descendants of the Sun are sent.
 Urseville-Beylestein: Prince Paul's country in the 1902 book Love and the Soul Hunter by John Oliver Hobbes.
 Urzikstan: a fictional country in Caucasus, from the 2019 video game Call of Duty: Modern Warfare.

V 

 Varania: appeared in the Three Investigators series (created by Robert Arthur, Jr.) in the book The Mystery of the Silver Spider (1967).
 Vascovy: appeared in John Oxenham (William A. Dunkerley), A Princess of Vascovy (1899).
 Vesbaria or Wessbaria is a fictional state created for the joint Russo-Belarusian Zapad 2017 exercise. Supports Veyshnoria in its struggle for independence. The territory of Vesbaria corresponds to that of Lithuania and Lower Latvia.
 Veyska: Baltic state suffering dictatorial rule in the Mission: Impossible TV episode "The Astrologer".
 Veyshnoria or Veishnoriya, a fictional opponent state created for the joint Russo-Belarusian Zapad 2017 exercise that was concurrently co-opted as an internet micronation by elements of the Belarusian opposition and others. The territory of Veyshnoria corresponds to that of the Grodno Region and the northwestern parts of the Minsk and Vitebsk regions.
 Vlatava: European monarchy in the DC Universe.
 Vulgaria: Home to the Baron and Baroness Bomburst in Chitty Chitty Bang Bang and from The Three Stooges episode, Dutiful But Dumb. Also used as a fake name for former Yugoslavia by Lawrence Durrell in some of his Antrobus short stories.

W 
 Warnerstock: a small country between France and Germany in the film Wakko's Wish
 Weselton: a duchy in Frozen, neighbour of Arendelle.
 Wolfkrone: a small kingdom in the Soulcalibur video game series.
 Wolkekuckukkland: G.I. Joe: A Real American Hero, the neighboring country of Darklonia; the name is German for Cloud-Cuckoo-Land, from Aristophanes' play, "The Birds".

Y 
 Yakestonia: mountainous eastern European nation, where yodeling is prominent in local culture, but so is surfing on its coast. Important landmark is Mount Bubneboba, and its fresh mountain air is celebrated worldwide. A traditional greeting is doing an armpit fart while repeating the word "zwooba!". Home of exchange student Fentruck on the animated series Doug.
 Yudonia: a central European country, presumably based on the former country of Yugoslavia, mentioned in an episode on the Nickelodeon show Drake & Josh.
 Yugaria: small Balkan nation from the Mission: Impossible: Operation Surma video game.

Z 
 Zandar: A small principality seen in Power Rangers: Dino Charge. Home of Sir Ivan, the Gold Dino Charge Ranger, and Prince Philip, the Graphite Ranger. The people of Zandar speak with British accents.
 Zarkovia: A small yet strategically important country somewhere in Eastern Europe with an absolute monarchy featured in the Ben 10: Ultimate Alien episode Viktor: The Spoils.
Zembla: Northern European country in Vladimir Nabokov's novel Pale Fire
Zemenia: Eastern European country in episode 6, season 7 of Monk (TV series)
 Zindaria: a brand-new one that existed in Europe during the English Regency era of 1811–1820, Anne Gracie's The Stolen Princess (2008).
 Zubrowka: location of the eponymous hotel in the 2014 film The Grand Budapest Hotel, a European alpine state ravaged by war and poverty; unrelated to the Polish vodka Żubrówka.

References

External links

 
European countries
Fictional